Giannoulis Larentzakis (Greek: Γιαννούλης Λαρεντζάκης, born 22 September 1993) is a Greek professional basketball player for Olympiacos of the Greek Basket League and the EuroLeague. At a height of 1.96 m (6'5") tall, he plays at the shooting guard and small forward positions.

Early life and career
Larentzakis was born in Maroussi, Athens, Greece, on 22 September 1993. As a youth, he grew up on the Greek island of Kythnos. He began playing basketball with the youth clubs of PAO Amilla Peristeriou. In 2010, at the age of 17, he joined the senior men's team of Aigaleo. He played with the club in the Greek 3rd Division's 2010–11 season.

Professional career
Larentzakis began his professional career with the Greek League club Ikaros, during the 2011–12 season. In 2013, he moved to the Greek club Aris, signing a three-year contract with the team. On 28 August 2014 he moved to the Greek club Kolossos Rodou, on loan from Aris.

On 28 July 2015 it was announced that Larentzakis would continue his loan spell, for another year, with Kolossos. In 27 games played with Kolossos, during the Greek League 2015–16 season, he averaged 11.9 points, 4.2 rebounds, 2.9 assists, and 1.4 steals per game. On 24 May 2016 Larentzakis signed a four-year contract with the Spanish club CAI Zaragoza, of the Spanish ACB League.

On 9 June 2016 Greek club AEK Athens paid Larentzakis' 25,000 euros buyout to CAI Zaragoza, and signed him to a four-year contract. With AEK, he won the title, 2018 edition of the Greek Cup, and the FIBA Champions League's 2017–18 season championship. On 17 October 2018, in a 2018–19 FIBA Champions League season game, Larentzakis scored a career high against the Czech Republic club ČEZ Nymburk, as he scored 23 points. In the same game, he also had 4 rebounds and 3 assists, while shooting 7 of 8 from the three-point line. On 25 July 2019 Larentzakis and AEK mutually parted ways, forfeiting the last year of his contract.

In September 2019, Larentzakis signed a two-year contract with the Spanish ACB League club Murcia.

In July 2020, Larentzakis signed with Greek League club Olympiacos on a three-year deal.

National team career

Greek junior national team
Larentzakis played at the 2011 FIBA Europe Under-18 Championship, the 2012 FIBA Europe Under-20 Championship, and the 2013 FIBA Europe Under-20 Championship with the junior national teams of Greece.

Greek senior national team
Larentzakis became a member of the senior Greek national basketball team in 2017. With Greece, he played at the 2019 FIBA European World Cup qualification tournament, and also at the 2019 FIBA World Cup.

In September, Larentzakis also participated in the EuroBasket 2022 with Greece. Coming off the bench, he averaged 6.1 points, 1 rebound and 0.6 assists on 10.1 minutes a game. His best game was against Germany during the knockout stage, where he, despite the team's loss of 107-96, put up 18 points, 4 rebounds and 1 assist in 17 minutes.

Personal life
Larentzakis' personal nickname is "Lary". His family originates from the Greek island of Kythnos. His basketball nickname is "Cobra".

Awards and accomplishments

Pro career
AEK Athens
FIBA Intercontinental Cup Champion: (2019)
FIBA Champions League Champion: (2018)
Greek Cup Winner: (2018)
Olympiacos
Greek League Winner: (2022)
2x Greek Cup Winner: (2022, 2023)
Greek Super Cup winner (2022)

Individual
2× Greek League All-Star (2019, 2022)

Career statistics

Domestic Leagues

Regular season

|-
| 2011–12
| style="text-align:left;"| Ikaros Kallitheas
| align=center | GBL
| 12 || 8.6 || .415 || .300 || .571 || .8 || .3 || .3 || 0 || 3.7
|-
| 2012–13
| style="text-align:left;"| Ikaros Kallitheas
| align=center | GBL
| 19 || 12.2 || .269 || .297 || .882 || 1.5 || 1.1 || .5 || 0 || 4.1
|-
| 2013–14
| style="text-align:left;"| Aris
| align=center | GBL
| 12 || 6.4 || .438 || .250 || .286 || .7 || .6 || .3 || 0 || 2.8
|-
| 2014–15
| style="text-align:left;"| Kolossos Rodou
| align=center | GBL
| 25 || 12.0 || .415 || .250 || .689 || 2.4 || 1.2 || .6 || .1 || 6.7
|-
| 2015–16
| style="text-align:left;"| Kolossos Rodou
| align=center | GBL
| 25 || 23.0 || .383 || .287 || .753 || 4.3 || 3.0 || 1.3 || 0 || 11.8
|-
| 2016–17
| style="text-align:left;"| AEK
| align=center | GBL
| 26 || 16.4 || .368 || .290 || .677 || 2.4 || 1.5 || 1.0 || .1 || 4.9
|-
| 2017–18
| style="text-align:left;"| AEK
| align=center | GBL
| 25 || 20.3 || .386 || .347 || .622 || 2.7 || 1.3 || .6 || .1 || 7.6
|-
| 2018–19
| style="text-align:left;"| AEK
| align=center | GBL
| 26 || 23.4 || .400 || .307 || .802 || 3.1 || 3.0 || 1.4 || .1 || 11.1
|-
| 2019–20
| style="text-align:left;"| UCAM Murcia 
| align=center | ACB
| 19 || 18.1 || .372 || .272 || .837 || 2.8 || 2.5 || .5 || .1 || 8.7
|-
| 2021–22
| style="text-align:left;"| Olympiacos
| align=center | GBL
| 24 || 16.5 || .521 || .471 || .879 || 2.0 || 2.5 || .9 || .1 || 9.3
|}

FIBA Champions League

|-
| style="text-align:left;" | 2016–17
| style="text-align:left;" | AEK
| 18 || 16.4 || .468 || .368 || .815 || 2.9 || 1.4 || 1.1 || .1 || 6.0
|-
| style="text-align:left;background:#AFE6BA;" | 2017–18†
| style="text-align:left;" | A.E.K.
| 19 || 21.8 || .362 || .313 || .811 || 2.2 || 1.3 || 1.1 || .0 || 7.1
|-
| style="text-align:left;" | 2018–19
| style="text-align:left;" | A.E.K.
| 18 || 22.9 || .392 || .308 || .857 || 3.9 || 2.6 || 1.7 || .1 || 9.8
|}

References

External links
Euroleague.net Profile
FIBA Profile
FIBA Europe Profile
Eurobasket.com Profile
Spanish League Profile 
Greek League Profile 
Hellenic Federation Profile 
Draftexpress.com Profile
NBADraft.net Profile

1993 births
Living people
2019 FIBA Basketball World Cup players
AEK B.C. players
Aigaleo B.C. players
Aris B.C. players
CB Murcia players
Greek expatriate basketball people in Spain
Greek men's basketball players
Ikaros B.C. players
Kolossos Rodou B.C. players
Liga ACB players
Olympiacos B.C. players
Point guards
Shooting guards
Small forwards
Basketball players from Athens